Lestremia is a genus of midges in the family Cecidomyiidae. There are 18 described species in this genus. It was established by French entomologist Pierre-Justin-Marie Macquart in 1826.

Species
Lestremia allahabadensis Grover, 1970
Lestremia calcuttaensis Mani, 1937
Lestremia ceylandica Kieffer, 1912
Lestremia cinerea Macquart, 1826
Lestremia clivicola Hardy, 1960
Lestremia deepica Sharma & Rao, 1980
Lestremia deploegi Nel & Prokop, 2006
Lestremia eocenica Nel & Prokop, 2006
Lestremia indica Kieffer, 1909
Lestremia leucophaea (Meigen, 1818)
Lestremia nigra Blanchard, 1852
Lestremia novaezealandiae Marshall, 1896
Lestremia palikuensis Hardy, 1960
Lestremia parvostylia Jaschhof, 1994
Lestremia pinites Meunier, 1904
Lestremia sanctijohanni Rao, 1951
Lestremia solidaginis (Felt, 1907)
Lestremia ugandae Barnes, 1936

References

Cecidomyiidae genera
Insects described in 1826
Taxa named by Pierre-Justin-Marie Macquart